Benjamin William Everitt (born 22 November 1979) is a British Conservative Party politician who has served as the Member of Parliament (MP) for Milton Keynes North since the 2019 general election.

Early life and career 
Everitt was born in Grantham, Lincolnshire, in 1979 to parents Peter and Rosemary Everitt. He attended The King's School in Grantham, and then Durham University, where he obtained a BSc. Everitt worked as a management consultant for Deloitte from 2009 to 2012. He was latterly head of strategy for the Institute of Chartered Accountants in England and Wales from 2012 to 2020.

Political career

At the 2015 local elections, Everitt was elected to Aylesbury Vale District Council, representing Great Brickhill and Newton Longville ward for the Conservatives. He was elected as the MP for the marginal Milton Keynes North constituency at the 2019 general election, succeeding the former Conservative MP Mark Lancaster. In 2020, Aylesbury Vale became part of the newly created Buckinghamshire Council, with Everitt serving as a councillor on the new unitary authority until the inaugural elections in May 2021.

In 2020, Everitt became chairman of the All-Party Parliamentary Group for Housing Market and Housing Delivery. He also became chair of the All-Party Parliamentary Group on Connected and Automated Mobility with his Milton Keynes North constituency being home to numerous automated mobility trials including driverless cars.

Everitt is a supporter of Brexit. He was successful in campaigning for a new £200 million Women and Children's Hospital in Milton Keynes, alongside fellow Conservative MP Iain Stewart, who represents Milton Keynes South.

In November 2020, Everitt was one of more than 50 MPs who signed a letter calling on a proposed pay rise for MPs to be scrapped due to the coronavirus pandemic. The pay rise was scrapped in December.

Everitt has called on the Chancellor, Rishi Sunak, to extend the Stamp Duty holiday which had been put in place to support movers and the housing market during the pandemic.

Controversies

Everitt was criticised by opponents during the 2019 election campaign for allegedly staging a photo of himself picking up litter in the car park of the Conservative Club in Bletchley.

Transphobia
In May 2020, a tweet posted by Everitt in 2011 was shared on social media, in which he referred to the late Labour MP Tessa Jowell as looking like "a tranny with a hangover". He apologised for the remark.

Personal life 
He married Emma Skinner in 2006; the couple have a son and two daughters. He lists his recreations as "family, watching Rugby, drinking beer", and is a member of the United and Cecil Club.

References

External links

Living people
1979 births
Conservative Party (UK) MPs for English constituencies
UK MPs 2019–present
Alumni of Durham University